Buttle may refer to:

Buttle (surname)
Buttle, Gotland, a settlement on the Swedish island of Gotland
Buttle Lake, a lake on Vancouver Island in Strathcona Regional District, British Columbia, Canada
Buttle UK, a children's charity based in the United Kingdom